Phosphorus selenides are a relatively obscure group of compounds. There have been some studies of the phosphorus - selenium phase diagram and the glassy amorphous phases are reported. The compounds that have been reported are shown below. While some of phosphorus selenides are similar to their sulfide analogues, there are some new forms, molecular  and the polymeric catena-. There is also some doubt about the existence of molecular .

Crystallographically confirmed compounds

Molecular  has a norbornane like structure with two phosphorus atoms with oxidation state +3 bridged by two diselenide units (analogous to disulfide) and one selenide unit. It was isolated by solvent extraction from a  amorphous phase made from the elements.

It can be prepared from the elements. One preparation is to extract and recrystallise using tetralin.

catena-
This compound consists of polymeric chains of norbornane-like units joined by Se atoms. As each P atom in the repeat unit is bonded to another P atom and to two Se atoms, each P atom has a formal oxidation state of +2.

Compounds confirmed spectroscopically

has two crystalline forms α- with the same molecular structure as α- and β- with same molecular structure as β-. A fully characterised compound  contains  with a β- structure.

One well-known textbook does not mention it at all.

A review (2001) examining P-Se amorphous phases did not confirm the presence of molecular . The isoelectronic anion  which has the adamantane like  structure is known, an example is the sodium salt .

Other compounds
, have been reported.

Phosphorus - selenium glasses
Phosphorus - selenium glasses have been examined using 31P-NMR and Raman spectroscopy. For x < 0.47 the glasses contain  chain fragments, pyramidal P units (P oxidation state +3), quasi-tetrahedral P units (P oxidation state +5, with P=Se double bond) and  units (P in formal oxidation state +4). There is no evidence for an amorphous phase containing molecular .

References

Inorganic phosphorus compounds
Selenides